Po Phaok The (?–1835), also known as Po Phaok or Cei Phaok The, was the last ruler of Champa from 1829 to 1832. His Vietnamese name was Nguyễn Văn Thừa (阮文承).

Po Phaok The was a son of Po Saong Nyung Ceng (Nguyễn Văn Chấn). In 1829, the Champa ruler Po Klan Thu (Nguyễn Văn Vĩnh) died. Po Phao The was appointed the new ruler by Viceroy of southern Vietnam Lê Văn Duyệt without Emperor Minh Mạng's permission. Po Phaok The was granted the Vietnamese title Thuận Thành trấn Khâm sai Thống binh cai cơ; Po Dhar Kaok (Nguyễn Văn Nguyên) was appointed as his viceroy, or the deputy ruler.

During his reign, Champa ended its relationship with Huế court; they only sent tribute to Lê Văn Duyệt, the viceroy of Cochinchina. Lê Văn Duyệt died in 1832. Soon after Duyệt's death, Minh Mạng's new appointees arrived in Cochinchina and took over the local administration. At the same time, Champa was annexed by Vietnam. Po Phaok The and Po Dhar Kaok were captured and transferred to Huế. In there, Po Phaok The was granted the Vietnamese noble title, Diên Ân bá (延恩伯, "Count of Diên Ân").

During the king's absence, there were two major rebellions broke out in Panduranga area: Katip Sumat uprising (1832-1834) and Ja Thak Wa uprising (1834-1835). However, both were put down by Vietnamese.

In 1835, Po Phaok The and Po Dhar Kaok were executed by Emperor Minh Mạng.

There was a history record about him: Ariya Po Phaok. The record was written in Cham script. It was kept in Société Asiatique de Paris.

References

Kings of Champa
1835 deaths
Year of birth unknown
People executed by Vietnam